Gerald Coates (25 November 1944 – 3 April 2022) was an author, speaker, broadcaster and the founder of Pioneer, a neocharismatic evangelicalChristian network of churches and forums,  established to "develop new churches across the UK and engage in mission globally."

Work
Coates was an author, speaker  and a broadcaster, in both secular and religious media.

The Pioneer network he founded is a charismatic group of evangelical churches. It is part of the British New Church Movement  and can also be described as Restorationist. He later handed over the leadership of the movement to Billy and Caroline Kennedy of New Community, Southampton. Coates himself was responsible for coining the term "New Church" to replace the more confusing former name "House Church Movement," of which he was also a founding member. Along with Roger T. Forster of Ichthus Christian Fellowship and Lynn Green of Youth with a Mission, he was one of the founders of March for Jesus.

He led a church in Leatherhead called Engage, which initially met in the former Thorndike Theatre, but later gathered in Church Halls, Leatherhead. He founded and ran a series of training courses called Insight, which is, in charismatic idiom, a "school of prophecy." He was the chair of the Charismatic Evangelical Round Table for 16 years, was involved with Pioneer's National Churches Forum,  and CRAC (the Central Religious Advisory Council).

Reputation
P D Hocken described Coates as a "dynamic and somewhat flamboyant figure, whose insistence on the gospel of grace has sometimes produced controversy."  Karla Poewe noted his reputation for generosity when working with churches of other nations. Sir Cliff Richard said "As a Christian influencer, Gerald has been at the forefront of much of today's radical church activity, I've come to respect his opinions and initiatives, as well as his more personal counsel." Prolific author and former minister of Westminster Chapel R. T. Kendall described him as, "brilliant, controversial, unpredictable, lovable and quotable."  Author Michael Green said, "He is a colourful troubadour in a world of grey men ...committed to Christian unity." Author and speaker J.John said, "Gerald's influence on British Christianity over the last 40 years has been extraordinary."

Personal life
He married Anona in 1967 and had three sons, two grandsons and two grand daughters. They lived in Bookham, Leatherhead, Surrey. He died on 3 April 2022 at the age of 78.

Bibliography
 Gerald Coates - Pioneer. Biography Ralph Turner, (md 2016) 
 Sexual Healing with Nathan Ferreira (md 2013)
Non-Religious Christianity. (Revival Press 1998) 
 The Vision. (Kingsway 1995) 
 Kingdom Now! (Kingsway 1993)  
 An Intelligent Fire (Eastbourne: Kingsway,1991)  - an autobiography
 Divided We Stand (Eastbourne: Kingsway, 1987) 
 Gerald Quotes (Eastbourne: Kingsway, 1984) 
 What on Earth is this Kingdom? Kingsway, 1983

See also 
 British New Church Movement

References

External links 
 Pioneer Engage Church, where Coates was a Team Leader
 Pioneer Trust

1944 births
2022 deaths
Apostolic networks
British New Church Movement
British evangelicals
People from Mole Valley (district)